

Events

Pre-1600
1066 – The Norman conquest of England begins with the Battle of Hastings.
1322 – Robert the Bruce of Scotland defeats King Edward II of England at the Battle of Old Byland, forcing Edward to accept Scotland's independence.
1586 – Mary, Queen of Scots, goes on trial for conspiracy against Queen Elizabeth I of England.

1601–1900
1656 – The General Court of the Massachusetts Bay Colony enacts the first punitive legislation against the Religious Society of Friends.
1758 – Seven Years' War: Frederick the Great suffers a rare defeat at the Battle of Hochkirch.
1773 – The first recorded ministry of education, the Commission of National Education, is formed in the Polish–Lithuanian Commonwealth.
1774 – American Revolution: The First Continental Congress denounces the British Parliament's Intolerable Acts and demands British concessions.
1805 – War of the Third Coalition: A French corps defeats an Austrian attempt to escape encirclement at Ulm.
1806 – War of the Fourth Coalition: Napoleon decisively defeats Prussia at the Battle of Jena–Auerstedt.
1808 – The Republic of Ragusa is annexed by France.
1843 – Irish nationalist Daniel O'Connell is arrested by the British on charges of criminal conspiracy.
1863 – American Civil War: Confederate troops under the command of A. P. Hill fail to drive the Union Army completely out of Virginia.
1884 – George Eastman receives a U.S. Government patent on his new paper-strip photographic film.
1888 – Louis Le Prince films the first motion picture, Roundhay Garden Scene.
1898 – The steam ship  sinks near the Lizard peninsula, Cornwall, killing 106.

1901–present
1908 – The Chicago Cubs defeat the Detroit Tigers, 2–0, clinching the 1908 World Series; this would be their last until winning the 2016 World Series.
1910 – English aviator Claude Grahame-White lands his aircraft on Executive Avenue near the White House in Washington, D.C.
1912 – Former president Theodore Roosevelt is shot and mildly wounded by John Flammang Schrank. With the fresh wound in his chest, and the bullet still within it, Roosevelt delivers his scheduled speech.
1913 – Senghenydd colliery disaster, the United Kingdom's worst coal mining accident, claims the lives of 439 miners.
1915 – World War I: Bulgaria joins the Central Powers.
1920 – Finland and Soviet Russia sign the Treaty of Tartu, exchanging some territories.
1923 – After the Irish Civil War the 1923 Irish hunger strikes were undertaken by thousands of Irish republican prisoners protesting the continuation of their internment without trial.
1930 – The former and first President of Finland, K. J. Ståhlberg, and his wife, Ester Ståhlberg, are kidnapped from their home by members of the far-right Lapua Movement.
1933 – Germany withdraws from the League of Nations and World Disarmament Conference.
1939 – World War II: The  sinks the British battleship  within her harbour at Scapa Flow, Scotland.
1940 – World War II: The Balham underground station disaster kills sixty-six people during the London Blitz.
1943 – World War II: Prisoners at Sobibor extermination camp covertly assassinate most of the on-duty SS officers and then stage a mass breakout.
  1943   – World War II: The United States Eighth Air Force loses 60 of 291 B-17 Flying Fortresses during the Second Raid on Schweinfurt.
  1943   – World War II: The Second Philippine Republic, a puppet state of Japan, is inaugurated with José P. Laurel as its president.
1947 – Chuck Yeager becomes the first person to exceed the speed of sound.
1949 – The Smith Act trials of Communist Party leaders in the United States convicts eleven defendants of conspiring to advocate the violent overthrow of the federal government.
1952 – Korean War: The Battle of Triangle Hill is the biggest and bloodiest battle of 1952.
1956 – Dr. B. R. Ambedkar, leader of India's Untouchable caste, converts to Buddhism along with 385,000 of his followers (see Neo-Buddhism).
1957 – The 23rd Canadian Parliament becomes the only one to be personally opened by the Queen of Canada.
  1957   – At least 81 people are killed in the most devastating flood in the history of the Spanish city of Valencia.
1962 – The Cuban Missile Crisis begins when an American reconnaissance aircraft takes photographs of Soviet ballistic missiles being installed in Cuba.
1964 – Martin Luther King Jr. receives the Nobel Peace Prize for combating racial inequality through nonviolence. 
  1964   – The Soviet Presidium and the Communist Party Central Committee each vote to accept Nikita Khrushchev's "voluntary" request to retire from his offices.
1966 – The city of Montreal begins the operation of its underground Montreal Metro rapid transit system.
1968 – Apollo program: The first live television broadcast by American astronauts in orbit is performed by the Apollo 7 crew.
  1968   – The 6.5  Meckering earthquake shakes the southwest portion of Western Australia with a maximum Mercalli intensity of IX (Violent), causing $2.2 million in damage and leaving 20–28 people injured.
  1968   – Jim Hines becomes the first man ever to break the so-called "ten-second barrier" in the 100-meter sprint with a time of 9.95 seconds.
1973 – In the Thammasat student uprising, over 100,000 people protest in Thailand against the military government. Seventy-seven are killed and 857 are injured by soldiers.
1975 – An RAF Avro Vulcan bomber explodes and crashes over Żabbar, Malta after an aborted landing, killing five crew members and one person on the ground.
1979 – The first National March on Washington for Lesbian and Gay Rights draws approximately 100,000 people.
1980 – The 6th Congress of the Workers' Party ended, having anointed North Korean President Kim Il-sung's son Kim Jong-il as his successor.
1981 – Vice President Hosni Mubarak is elected as the President of Egypt, one week after the assassination of Anwar Sadat.
1982 – U.S. President Ronald Reagan proclaims a War on Drugs.
1991 – Burmese opposition leader Aung San Suu Kyi is awarded the Nobel Peace Prize.
1994 – Yasser Arafat, Yitzhak Rabin and Shimon Peres receive the Nobel Peace Prize for their role in the establishment of the Oslo Accords and the framing of future Palestinian self government.
1998 – Eric Rudolph is charged with six bombings, including the 1996 Centennial Olympic Park bombing in Atlanta, Georgia.
2003 – The Steve Bartman Incident takes place at Wrigley Field in Chicago, Illinois.
2004 – MK Airlines Flight 1602 crashes during takeoff from Halifax Stanfield International Airport, killing all seven people on board.
  2004   – Pinnacle Airlines Flight 3701 crashes in Jefferson City, Missouri. The two pilots (the aircraft's only occupants) are killed.
2012 – Felix Baumgartner successfully jumps to Earth from a balloon in the stratosphere.
2014 – A snowstorm and avalanche in the Nepalese Himalayas triggered by the remnants of Cyclone Hudhud kills 43 people.
  2014   – The Serbia vs. Albania UEFA qualifying match is canceled after 42 minutes due to several incidents on and off the pitch. Albania is eventually awarded a win.
2015 – A suicide bomb attack in Pakistan kills at least seven people and injures 13 others.
2017 – A massive truck bombing in Somalia kills 358 people and injures more than 400 others.
2021 – About 10,000 American employees of John Deere go on strike.

Births

Pre-1600
1257 – Przemysł II of Poland (d. 1296)
1404 – Marie of Anjou (d. 1463)
1425 – Alesso Baldovinetti, Italian painter (d. 1499)
1465 – Konrad Peutinger, German humanist and antiquarian (d. 1547)
1493 – Shimazu Tadayoshi, Japanese daimyō (d. 1568)
1542 – Philip IV, Count of Nassau-Weilburg (d. 1602)
1563 – Jodocus Hondius, Flemish engraver and cartographer (d. 1611)
1569 – Giambattista Marino, Italian poet (d. 1625)

1601–1900
1609 – Ernest Günther, Duke of Schleswig-Holstein-Sonderburg-Augustenburg (d. 1689)
1630 – Sophia of Hanover (d. 1714)
1633 – James II of England (d. 1701)
1639 – Simon van der Stel, Dutch commander and politician, 1st Governor of the Dutch Cape Colony (d. 1712)
1643 – Bahadur Shah I, Mughal emperor (d. 1712)
1644 – William Penn, English businessman who founded Pennsylvania (d. 1718)
1687 – Robert Simson, Scottish mathematician and academic (d. 1768)
1712 – George Grenville, English lawyer and politician, Prime Minister of the United Kingdom (d. 1770)
1726 – Charles Middleton, 1st Baron Barham, Scottish-English admiral and politician (d. 1813)
1733 – François Sébastien Charles Joseph de Croix, Count of Clerfayt, Austrian field marshal (d. 1798)
1784 – Ferdinand VII of Spain (d. 1833)
1791 – Friedrich Parrot, Baltic German naturalist (d. 1841)
1801 – Joseph Plateau, Belgian physicist and academic, created the Phenakistoscope (d. 1883)
1806 – Preston King, American lawyer and politician (d. 1865)
1824 – Adolphe Monticelli, French painter (d. 1886)
1840 – Dmitry Pisarev, Russian author and critic (d. 1868)
1842 – Joe Start, American baseball player and manager (d. 1927)
1844 – John See, English-Australian politician, 14th Premier of New South Wales (d. 1907)
1845 – Laura Askew Haygood (d. 1900)
1848 – Byron Edmund Walker, Canadian banker and philanthropist (d. 1924)
1853 – John William Kendrick, American engineer and businessman (d. 1924)
1861 – Julia A. Ames, American journalist, editor, and reformer (d. 1891)
1867 – Masaoka Shiki, Japanese poet, author, and critic (d. 1902)
1869 – Joseph Duveen, 1st Baron Duveen, English art dealer (d. 1939)
1871 – Alexander von Zemlinsky, Austrian composer, conductor, and teacher (d. 1942)
1872 – Reginald Doherty, English tennis player (d. 1910)
1882 – Éamon de Valera, American-Irish rebel and politician, 3rd President of Ireland (d. 1975)
  1882   – Charlie Parker, English cricketer, coach, and umpire (d. 1959)
1888 – Katherine Mansfield, New Zealand novelist, short story writer, and essayist (d. 1923)
  1888   – Yukio Sakurauchi, Japanese businessman and politician, 27th Japanese Minister of Finance (d. 1947)
1890 – Dwight D. Eisenhower, American general and politician, 34th President of the United States (d. 1969)
1892 – Sumner Welles, American politician and diplomat, 11th Under Secretary of State (d. 1961)
1893 – Lois Lenski, American author and illustrator (d. 1974)
  1893   – Lillian Gish, American actress (d. 1993)
1894 – E. E. Cummings, American poet and playwright (d. 1962)
1894 – Victoria Drummond, British marine engineer (d. 1978)
1897 – Alicja Dorabialska, Polish chemist (d. 1975)
1898 – Thomas William Holmes, Canadian sergeant and pilot, Victoria Cross recipient (d. 1950)
1900 – W. Edwards Deming, American statistician, author, and academic (d. 1993)

1901–present
1902 – Learco Guerra, Italian cyclist and manager (d. 1963)
  1902   – Arthur Justice, Australian rugby league player, coach, and administrator (d. 1977)
1904 – Christian Pineau, French politician, French Minister of Foreign Affairs (d. 1995)
  1904   – Mikhail Pervukhin, Soviet politician, First Deputy Premier of the Soviet Union (d. 1978)
1906 – Hassan al-Banna, Egyptian religious leader, founded the Muslim Brotherhood (d. 1949)
  1906   – Hannah Arendt, German-American philosopher and theorist (d. 1975)
1907 – Allan Jones, American actor and singer (d. 1992)
1909 – Mochitsura Hashimoto, Japanese commander (d. 2000)
  1909   – Dorothy Kingsley, American screenwriter and producer (d. 1997)
  1909   – Bernd Rosemeyer, German racing driver (d. 1938)
1910 – John Wooden, American basketball player and coach (d. 2010) 
1911 – Lê Đức Thọ, Vietnamese general and politician, Nobel Prize laureate (d. 1990)
1914 – Harry Brecheen, American baseball player and coach (d. 2004)
  1914   – Raymond Davis Jr., American chemist and physicist, Nobel Prize laureate (d. 2006)
  1914   – Alexis Rannit, Estonian poet and critic (d. 1985)
1915 – Loris Francesco Capovilla, Italian cardinal (d. 2016)
1916 – C. Everett Koop, American admiral and surgeon, 13th United States Surgeon General (d. 2013)
1918 – Marcel Chaput, Canadian biochemist, journalist, and politician (d. 1991)
  1918   – Thelma Coyne Long, Australian tennis player and captain (d. 2015)
  1918   – Doug Ring, Australian cricketer and sportscaster (d. 2003)
1921 – José Arraño Acevedo, Chilean journalist and historian (d. 2009)
1923 – Joel Barnett, English accountant and politician, Chief Secretary to the Treasury (d. 2014)
1926 – Willy Alberti, Dutch singer and actor (d. 1985)
1927 – Roger Moore, English actor and producer (d. 2017)
1928 – Joyce Bryant, American actress and singer
  1928   – Frank E. Resnik, American chemist and businessman (d. 1995)
1929 – Yvon Durelle, Canadian boxer and wrestler (d. 2007)
1930 – Robert Parker, American singer and saxophonist (d. 2020)
  1930   – Mobutu Sese Seko, Congolese soldier and politician, President of Zaire (d. 1997)
  1930   – Alan Williams, Welsh journalist and politician, Shadow Secretary of State for Wales (d. 2014)
1932 – Enrico Di Giuseppe, American tenor and actor (d. 2005)
  1932   – Anatoly Larkin, Russian-American physicist and academic (d. 2005)
1936 – Hans Kraay Sr., Dutch footballer and manager (d. 2017)
  1936   – Jürg Schubiger, Swiss psychotherapist and author (d. 2014)
1938 – Farah Pahlavi, Empress of Iran
  1938   – John Dean, American lawyer and author, 13th White House Counsel
  1938   – Elizabeth Esteve-Coll, English curator and academic
  1938   – Ron Lancaster, American-Canadian football player and coach (d. 2008)
  1938   – Shula Marks, South African historian and academic
  1938   – Melba Montgomery, American country music singer
1939 – Ralph Lauren, American fashion designer, founded the Ralph Lauren Corporation
  1939   – Rocky Thompson, American golfer and politician
1940 – Perrie Mans, South African snooker player
  1940   – Cliff Richard, Indian-English singer-songwriter and actor
  1940   – J. C. Snead, American golfer
  1940   – Christopher Timothy, Welsh actor, director, and screenwriter
1941 – Jerry Glanville, American football player and coach
  1941   – Eddie Keher, Irish sportsman
  1941   – Laurie Lawrence, Australian rugby player and coach
  1941   – Art Shamsky, American baseball player and manager
  1941   – Roger Taylor, English tennis player
1942 – Bob Hiller, English rugby player
  1942   – Evelio Javier, Filipino lawyer and politician (d. 1986)
  1942   – Péter Nádas, Hungarian author and playwright
  1942   – Suzzanna, Indonesian actress (d. 2008)
1943 – Mohammad Khatami, Iranian scholar and politician, 5th President of Iran
1944 – Udo Kier, German-American actor and director
1945 – Colin Hodgkinson, English bass player 
  1945   – Daan Jippes, Dutch author and illustrator
  1945   – Lesley Joseph, English actress
1946 – François Bozizé, Gabonese general and politician, President of the Central African Republic
  1946   – Joey de Leon, Filipino comedian, actor and television host
  1946   – Justin Hayward, English singer-songwriter and guitarist 
  1946   – Dan McCafferty, Scottish singer-songwriter (d. 2022)  
  1946   – Al Oliver, American baseball player
  1946   – Craig Venter, American biologist, geneticist, and academic
1947 – Norman Harris, American guitarist, songwriter, and producer (d. 1987)
  1947   – Charlie Joiner, American football player
  1947   – Nikolai Volkoff, Croatian-American wrestler (d. 2018)
1948 – Marcia Barrett, Jamaican-English singer 
  1948   – Norman Ornstein, American political scientist and scholar
1949 – Damian Lau, Hong Kong actor, director, and producer
  1949   – Katha Pollitt, American poet and author
  1949   – Dave Schultz, Canadian ice hockey player and referee
1950 – Joey Travolta, American actor, director, and producer
1951 – Aad van den Hoek, Dutch cyclist
1952 – Harry Anderson, American actor and screenwriter (d. 2018) 
  1952   – Nikolai Andrianov, Russian gymnast and coach (d. 2011)
  1952   – Rick Aviles, American comedian and actor (d. 1995)
1953 – Kazumi Watanabe, Japanese guitarist and composer
1954 – Mordechai Vanunu, Moroccan-Israeli technician and academic
1955 – Iwona Blazwick, English curator and critic
  1955   – Arleen Sorkin, American actress, producer, and screenwriter
1956 – Ümit Besen, Turkish singer-songwriter
  1956   – Beth Daniel, American golfer
  1956   – Jennell Jaquays, American game designer
1957 – Michel Després, Canadian lawyer and politician
  1957   – Gen Nakatani, Japanese lawyer and politician, 13th Japanese Minister of Defense
1958 – Thomas Dolby, English singer-songwriter and producer
1959 – A. J. Pero, American drummer (d. 2015)
1960 – Steve Cram, English runner and coach
  1960   – Zbigniew Kruszyński, Polish footballer and coach
1961 – Isaac Mizrahi, American fashion designer
1962 – Jaan Ehlvest, Estonian chess player
  1962   – Trevor Goddard, English-American actor (d. 2003)
  1962   – Chris Thomas King, American singer-songwriter, guitarist, producer, and actor
  1962   – Shahar Perkiss, Israeli tennis player
1963 – Lori Petty, American actress
1964 – Joe Girardi, American baseball player and manager
1965 – Steve Coogan, English actor, comedian, producer, and screenwriter
  1965   – Jüri Jaanson, Estonian rower and politician
  1965   – Constantine Koukias, Greek-Australian flute player and composer
  1965   – Karyn White, American singer-songwriter
1967 – Pat Kelly, American baseball player, coach, and manager
  1967   – Sylvain Lefebvre, Canadian ice hockey player and coach
  1967   – Werner Daehn, German actor
1968 – Jay Ferguson, Canadian guitarist and songwriter 
  1968   – Johnny Goudie, American singer-songwriter, guitarist, producer, and actor 
  1968   – Matthew Le Tissier, English footballer and journalist
  1968   – Dwayne Schintzius, American basketball player and coach (d. 2012)
1969 – P. J. Brown, American basketball player
  1969   – Viktor Onopko, Russian footballer and manager 
  1969   – David Strickland, American actor (d. 1999)
1970 – Martin Barbarič, Czech footballer and coach (d. 2013)
  1970   – Jim Jackson, American basketball player and sportscaster
  1970   – Meelis Lindmaa, Estonian footballer
  1970   – Hiromi Nagasaku, Japanese actress and singer
  1970   – Pär Zetterberg, Swedish footballer
  1970   – Vasko Vassilev, Bulgarian violinist
1971 – Jorge Costa, Portuguese footballer and manager
  1971   – Robert Jaworski Jr., Filipino basketball player and politician
1972 – Erika deLone, American tennis player
  1972   – Julian O'Neill, Australian rugby league player
1973 – Thom Brooks, American-British political philosopher and legal scholar
  1973   – George Floyd, American police brutality victim (d. 2020)
  1973   – Lasha Zhvania, Georgian businessman and politician
1974 – Jessica Drake, American porn actress and director
  1974   – Samuel José da Silva Vieira, Brazilian footballer
  1974   – Natalie Maines, American singer-songwriter 
  1974   – Viktor Röthlin, Swiss runner
  1974   – Tümer Metin, Turkish footballer
1975 – Michael Duberry, English footballer
  1975   – Floyd Landis, American cyclist
  1975   – Carlos Spencer, New Zealand rugby player
1976 – Tillakaratne Dilshan, Sri Lankan cricketer
1977 – Saeed Ajmal, Pakistani cricketer
  1977   – Barry Ditewig, Dutch footballer
  1977   – Kelly Schumacher, American-Canadian basketball and volleyball player
1978 – Justin Lee Brannan, American guitarist and songwriter, and politician 
  1978   – Paul Hunter, English snooker player (d. 2006)
  1978   – Jana Macurová, Czech tennis player
  1978   – Steven Thompson, Scottish footballer
  1978   – Usher, American singer-songwriter, dancer, and actor
1979 – Stacy Keibler, American wrestler and actress
  1979   – Liina-Grete Lilender, Estonian figure skater and coach
1980 – Paúl Ambrosi, Ecuadorian footballer
  1980   – Amjad Khan, Danish-English cricketer
  1980   – Scott Kooistra, American football player
  1980   – Niels Lodberg, Danish footballer
  1980   – Terrence McGee, American football player
  1980   – Ben Whishaw, English actor
1981 – Gautam Gambhir, Indian cricketer
1982 – Ryan Hall, American runner
  1982   – Matt Roth, American football player
1983 – Betty Heidler, German hammer thrower
  1983   – Lin Dan, Chinese badminton player
1984 – LaRon Landry, American football player
  1984   – Alex Scott, English footballer
1985 – Alexandre Sarnes Negrão, Brazilian racing driver
  1985   – Alanna Nihell, Irish boxer
  1985   – Ivan Pernar, Croatian Member of Parliament
1986 – Tom Craddock, English footballer
1988 – Glenn Maxwell, Australian cricketer
1989 – Arca, Venezuelan musician
1990 – Jordan Clark, English cricketer
1992 – Ahmed Musa, Nigerian footballer
1993 – Ashton Agar, Australian cricketer
1994 – Joe Burgess, English rugby league player
  1994   – Jaelen Feeney, Australian rugby league player
  1994   – Jared Goff, American football player
2001 – Rowan Blanchard, American actress

Deaths

Pre-1600
 530 – Antipope Dioscorus
 841 – Shi Yuanzhong, Chinese governor 
 869 – Pang Xun, Chinese rebel leader
 962 – Gerloc, Frankish noblewoman
 996 – Al-Aziz Billah, Fatimid caliph (b. 955)
1066 – Battle of Hastings:
                Harold Godwinson, English king (b. 1022)
                Leofwine Godwinson, English nobleman and brother of Harold
                Gyrth Godwinson, English nobleman and brother of Harold
1077 – Andronicus Ducas, Byzantine courtier (b. 1022)
1092 – Nizam al-Mulk, Persian scholar and politician (b. 1018)
1184 – Yusuf I, Almohad caliph (b. 1135)
1213 – Geoffrey Fitz Peter, 1st Earl of Essex, English sheriff and Chief Justiciar
1217 – Isabella, English noblewoman and wife of John of England (b. c. 1173)
1240 – Razia Sultana, Only female sultan of Delhi (b. c. 1205)
1256 – Kujō Yoritsugu, Japanese shogun (b. 1239)
1318 – Edward Bruce, High King of Ireland (b. 1275)
1366 – Ibn Nubata, Arab poet (b. 1287)
1416 – Henry the Mild, duke of Brunswick-Lüneburg
1536 – Garcilaso de la Vega, Spanish poet (b. 1503)
1552 – Oswald Myconius, Swiss theologian and reformer (b. 1488)
1565 – Thomas Chaloner, English poet and politician (b. 1521)
1568 – Jacques Arcadelt, Dutch singer and composer (b. 1507)

1601–1900
1610 – Amago Yoshihisa, Japanese daimyō (b. 1540)
1618 – Gervase Clifton, 1st Baron Clifton, English nobleman (b.c. 1570)
1619 – Samuel Daniel, English poet and historian (b. 1562)
1631 – Sophie of Mecklenburg-Güstrow, queen of Denmark and Norway (b. 1557)
1637 – Gabriello Chiabrera, Italian poet (b. 1552)
1669 – Antonio Cesti, Italian organist and composer (b. 1623)
1703 – Thomas Kingo, Danish bishop and poet (b. 1634)
1711 – Tewoflos, Ethiopian emperor (b. 1708)
1758 – James Francis Edward Keith, Scottish-Prussian field marshal (b. 1696)
1831 – Jean-Louis Pons, French astronomer and educator (b. 1761)

1901–present
1911 – John Marshall Harlan, American lawyer and politician (b. 1833)
1923 – Marcellus Emants, Dutch-Swiss author, poet, and playwright (b. 1848)
1929 – Henri Berger, German composer and bandleader (b. 1844)
1930 – Samuel van Houten, Dutch lawyer and politician, Dutch Minister of the Interior (b. 1837)
1942 – Noboru Yamaguchi, Japanese mob boss (b. 1902)
1943 – Sobibór uprising:
                Rudolf Beckmann, German SS officer (b. 1910)
                Siegfried Graetschus, German sergeant (b. 1916)
                Johann Niemann, German lieutenant (b. 1913)
1944 – Erwin Rommel, German field marshal (b. 1891)
1953 – Émile Sarrade, French rugby player and tug of war competitor (b. 1877)
  1953   – Kyuichi Tokuda, Japanese lawyer and politician (b. 1894)
1958 – Douglas Mawson, Australian geologist, academic, and explorer (b. 1882)
  1958   – Nikolay Zabolotsky, Russian-Soviet poet and translator (b. 1903)
1959 – Jack Davey, New Zealand-Australian singer and radio host (b. 1907)
1959 – Errol Flynn, Australian-American actor, singer, and producer (b. 1909)
1960 – Abram Ioffe, Russian physicist and academic (b. 1880)
1961 – Paul Ramadier, French politician, 129th Prime Minister of France (b. 1888)
  1961   – Harriet Shaw Weaver, English journalist and activist (b. 1876)
1965 – William Hogenson, American sprinter (b. 1884)
  1965   – Randall Jarrell, American poet and author (b. 1914)
1967 – Marcel Aymé, French author and playwright (b. 1902)
1969 – Haguroyama Masaji, Japanese sumo wrestler, the 36th Yokozuna (b. 1914)
  1969   – August Sang, Estonian poet and translator (b. 1914)
1973 – Edmund A. Chester, American journalist and broadcaster (b. 1897)
  1973   – Ahmed Hamdi, Egyptian general and engineer (b. 1929)
1976 – Edith Evans, English actress (b. 1888)
1977 – Bing Crosby, American singer-songwriter and actor (b. 1903)
1982 – Louis Rougier, French philosopher from the Vienna Circle (b. 1889)
1983 – Willard Price, Canadian-American historian and author (b. 1887)
1984 – Martin Ryle, English astronomer and physicist, Nobel Prize laureate (b. 1918)
1985 – Emil Gilels, Ukrainian-Russian pianist (b. 1916)
1986 – Keenan Wynn, American actor (b. 1916)
  1986   – Takahiko Yamanouchi, Japanese physicist (b. 1902)
1990 – Leonard Bernstein, American pianist, composer, and conductor (b. 1918)
1997 – Harold Robbins, American author (b. 1915)
1998 – Cleveland Amory, American author and activist (b. 1917)
  1998   – Frankie Yankovic, American accordion player (b. 1916)
1999 – Julius Nyerere, Tanzanian educator and politician, 1st President of Tanzania (b. 1922)
2000 – Art Coulter, Canadian-American ice hockey player (b. 1909)
  2000   – Tony Roper, American race car driver (b. 1964)
2002 – Norbert Schultze, German composer and conductor (b. 1911)
2003 – Patrick Dalzel-Job, English linguist, commander, and navigator (b. 1913)
2006 – Freddy Fender, American singer-songwriter and guitarist (b. 1937)
  2006   – Klaas Runia, Dutch theologian and journalist (b. 1926)
  2006   – Gerry Studds, American educator and politician (b. 1937)
2008 – Robert Furman, American engineer and intelligence officer (b. 1915)
  2008   – Kazys Petkevičius, Lithuanian basketball player and coach (b. 1926)
2009 – Martyn Sanderson, New Zealand actor and screenwriter (b. 1938)
  2009   – Collin Wilcox, American actress (b. 1935)
  2009   – Lou Albano, American professional wrestler (b. 1933)
2010 – Simon MacCorkindale, English actor, director, and producer (b. 1952)
  2010   – Benoit Mandelbrot, Polish-American mathematician and economist (b. 1924)
2011 – Reg Alcock, Canadian businessman and politician (b. 1948)
  2011   – Ashawna Hailey, American computer scientist and philanthropist (b. 1949)
2012 – John Clive, English actor and author (b. 1933)
  2012   – Max Fatchen, Australian journalist and author (b. 1920)
  2012   – James R. Grover Jr., American lawyer and politician (b. 1919)
  2012   – Larry Sloan, American publisher, co-founded Price Stern Sloan (b. 1922)
  2012   – Arlen Specter, American lieutenant and politician (b. 1930)
  2012   – Dody Weston Thompson, American photographer (b. 1923)
  2012   – Gart Westerhout, Dutch-American astronomer and academic (b. 1927)
2013 – Wally Bell, American baseball player and umpire (b. 1965)
  2013   – Max Cahner, German-Catalan historian and politician (b. 1936)
  2013   – Kōichi Iijima, Japanese author and poet (b. 1930)
  2013   – Bruno Metsu, French footballer and manager (b. 1954)
  2013   – Frank Moore, American painter and poet (b. 1946)
  2013   – Käty van der Mije-Nicolau, Romanian-Dutch chess player (b. 1940)
2014 – A. H. Halsey, English sociologist and academic (b. 1923)
  2014   – Leonard Liggio, American author and academic (b. 1933)
  2014   – Elizabeth Peña, American actress (b. 1959)
2015 – Nurlan Balgimbayev, Kazakh politician, 3rd Prime Minister of Kazakhstan (b. 1947)
  2015   – Mathieu Kérékou, Beninese soldier and politician, President of Benin (b. 1933)
  2015   – Margaret Keyes, American historian and academic (b. 1918)
  2015   – Radhakrishna Hariram Tahiliani, Indian admiral (b. 1930)
2016 – Helen Kelly, New Zealand trade union leader (b. 1964)
2019 – Harold Bloom, American literary critic (b. 1930)
  2019   – Sulli, South Korean actress, singer, and model (b. 1994)
2021 – Lee Wan-koo, South Korean politician, 39th Prime Minister of South Korea
2022 – Robbie Coltrane, Scottish actor, comedian and writer (b. 1950)

Holidays and observances
Christian feast day:
Angadrisma
Fortunatus of Todi
Joseph Schereschewsky (Episcopal Church (USA))
Pope Callixtus I
October 14 (Eastern Orthodox liturgics)
Intercession of the Theotokos
Day of the Cathedral of the Living Pillar (Georgian Orthodox Church)
Mother's Day (Belarus)
National Education Day (Poland), formerly Teachers' Day
Nyerere Day (Tanzania)
Second Revolution Day (Yemen)
World Standards Day (International)
Defender of Ukraine Day (Ukraine)

References

External links

 
 
 

Days of the year
October